Robert Ter Tsu Huang is a Taiwanese-American executive who was the founder of Synnex Corporation, which merged with Tech Data in 2021 to form TD Synnex and was chairman of the board until retirement in June 2010. He was born in Taiwan in 1945.

Career 
Huang received a B.S. degree in electrical engineering from Kyushu University, in Japan, then M.S. and M.A. degrees in electrical engineering and statistics from University of Rochester in the United States in 1970 and 1976, followed by a third Masters degree, a M.S. in management science from the MIT Sloan School of Management. Kyushu University, which awarded Huang a doctorate honoris causa, habitually refers to him as Dr. Robert T. Huang.

After working as the headquarters sales manager for Advanced Micro Devices, Huang founded Synnex Corporation in 1980. For almost thirty years, until December 2008, he was the company's president and co-chief executive officer. Thereafter, he was elected chairman of the board and was a member of the executive committee of the board of directors until June 2010. After leaving the board, he continued to work with Synnex as leader of SB Pacific Corporation, a joint venture.

Legacy 

Huang founded QREC, also called the Robert T. Huang Entrepreneurship Program of Kyushu University headquartered in the Robert T. Huang Entrepreneurship Center, in 2010 on the occasion of the university's centennial. Kyushu University's VBL, its government budgeted 1995 Venture Business Laboratory "For Promotion of Creative Research and Development Centered Around Graduate Schools", a venture research and development project incubator known for its "Venture Business Salon" and industry-academia collaborations, was transformed as the nucleus of QREC with the dual mandate of systematically furthering the "challenge" of creating "new values" in entrepreneurship and in educating in MOT, Management of Technology, with an annual US conference in Silicon Valley since 2006. QREC has hosed UNESCO symposia and its programs are promoted by NAIST at Japan's Ministry of Education, Culture, Sports, Science and Technology.

Bob and Lily Huang established the Huang Leadership Development Scholarship, a fund of Silicon Valley Community Foundation, for worldwide past and present employees, associates and families of what is now, after merger, the TD SYNNEX Corporation, for scholarship opportunities to pursue personal leadership development through higher education.

The Huangs have also established the Huang Pacific Foundation, based in the United States in the San Francisco Bay as a philanthropical institution.

Compensation 
While co-CEO of Synnex Corporation in 2008, Huang was paid $2,200,000, which included a base salary of $400,000 and a cash bonus of $1,800,000.

References 

Living people
American chief executives of Fortune 500 companies
American computer businesspeople
American corporate directors
American people of Taiwanese descent
American technology company founders
Kyushu University alumni
University of Rochester alumni
MIT Sloan School of Management alumni
American technology chief executives
1945 births
Taiwanese expatriates in Japan
American technology executives
Taiwanese emigrants to the United States